T7 was a sea-going torpedo boat operated by the Royal Yugoslav Navy between 1921 and 1941, after spending World War I in Austro-Hungarian Navy service. Originally 96 F, she was a 250t-class torpedo boat, and saw active service during World War I, performing convoy, patrol, escort and minesweeping tasks, and anti-submarine operations. Following Austria-Hungary's defeat in 1918, 96 F was allocated to the Navy of the Kingdom of Serbs, Croats and Slovenes, which later became the Royal Yugoslav Navy, and was renamed T7. At the time, she and the seven other 250t-class boats were the only modern sea-going vessels of the fledgling maritime force.

During the interwar period, T7 and the rest of the navy were involved in training exercises and cruises to friendly ports, but activity was limited by reduced naval budgets. The ship was captured by the Italians during the German-led Axis invasion of Yugoslavia in April 1941. After her main armament was modernised, she served with the Royal Italian Navy under her Yugoslav designation, conducting coastal and second-line escort duties in the Adriatic. Following the Italian capitulation in September 1943, she was handed over by the Germans to the Navy of the Independent State of Croatia. She was driven aground by British motor torpedo boats in June 1944 and destroyed by the British Army to prevent her salvage.

Background
In 1910, the Austria-Hungary Naval Technical Committee initiated the design and development of a  coastal torpedo boat, specifying that it should be capable of sustaining  for 10 hours. This specification was based upon an expectation that the Strait of Otranto, where the Adriatic Sea meets the Ionian Sea, would be blockaded by the hostile forces during a future conflict. Under such circumstances, there would be a need for a torpedo boat that could still sail from the Austro-Hungarian Navy base at the Bocche di Cattaro (Bay of Kotor) to the Strait during the night, locate and attack blockading ships and return to port before morning. Steam turbine power was selected for propulsion, as diesels with the necessary power were not available, and the Austro-Hungarian Navy did not have the practical experience to run turbo-electric boats. Stabilimento Tecnico Triestino (STT) of Trieste was selected for the contract to build the first eight vessels, designated as the T-group. Another tender was requested for four more boats, but when Ganz & Danubius reduced their price by ten percent, a total of sixteen boats were ordered from them, designated as the F-group. The F-group's designation signified the location of Ganz & Danubius' main shipyard at Fiume. 96 F was the fifteenth boat of the F-group to be fully completed.

Description and construction
The crew consisted of 38–41 officers and enlisted men. The boats were powered by two AEG-Curtiss steam turbines driving two propellers, using steam generated by two Yarrow water-tube boilers, one of which burned fuel oil and the other coal. The F-group had two funnels rather than the single funnel of the T-group. Due to inadequate funding, 96 F and the rest of the 250t class were essentially coastal vessels, despite the original intention that they would be used for "high seas" operations. They were the first small Austro-Hungarian Navy boats to use turbines, and this contributed to ongoing problems with them.

The boats were armed with two Škoda  L/30 guns, and four  torpedo tubes. They could also carry 10–12 naval mines. 96 F was the second-to-last of its group to be completed, and was laid down on 24 February 1915, launched on 7 July 1916 and completed on 23 November of that year.

Career

World War I and the interwar period
During World War I, 96 F was used for convoy, patrol, escort and minesweeping tasks, and anti-submarine operations. In 1917, one of the  guns on each boat of the class was placed on an anti-aircraft mount. On 3 June, the destroyers  and Csikós, along with 96 F and another 250t-class boat, had a brief encounter with three Italian MAS boats off the mouth of the Tagliamento river in the far north of the Adriatic.

96 F survived the war intact. In 1920, under the terms of the previous year's Treaty of Saint-Germain-en-Laye by which rump Austria officially ended World War I, she was allocated to the Kingdom of Serbs, Croats and Slovenes (KSCS, later Yugoslavia). Along with three other 250t-class F-group boats, 87 F, 93 F and 97 F, and four 250t-class T-group boats, she was transferred in March 1921 to the Navy of the KSCS, which later became the Royal Yugoslav Navy (KJRM). Renamed T7 in KJRM service, she and the other seven 250t-class boats were, at the outset, the only modern sea-going vessels in the KJRM. In 1925, exercises were conducted off the Dalmatian coast, involving the majority of the navy. It is not clear if T7 was one of the torpedo boats involved. The ships and crews made a very good impression while visiting Malta. In 1932, the British naval attaché reported that Yugoslav ships engaged in few exercises, manoeuvres or gunnery training due to reduced budgets.

World War II

In April 1941, Yugoslavia entered World War II when it was invaded by the German-led Axis powers. At the time of the invasion, T7 was assigned as the flagship of the 3rd Torpedo Division located at Šibenik, which included her three F-group sisters. On 8 April, the four boats of the 3rd Torpedo Division, along with other vessels, were tasked to support an attack on the Italian enclave of Zara (Zadar) on the Dalmatia coast. They were subjected to three Italian air attacks and, after the last one, sailed from the area of Zaton into Lake Prokljan, where they remained until 11 April. On 12 April, the 3rd Torpedo Division arrived at Milna on the island of Brač, and refused to follow orders to sail to the Bay of Kotor. All four F-group boats, including T7, were captured by the Italians.

T7 was then operated by the Italians under her Yugoslav designation, conducting coastal and second-line escort duties in the Adriatic. Her guns were replaced by two  L/40 anti-aircraft guns, but no other significant alterations were made to her. The Italians capitulated in September 1943, and once under German control, T7 was handed over to the Navy of the Independent State of Croatia, serving under her Yugoslav designation. Her crew came under the influence of the Yugoslav Partisans, and were preparing to mutiny when the Germans intervened. On 24 June 1944, she and the German S-boats S 154 and S 157 of the 7th S-Boat Flotilla were sailing between Šibenik and Rijeka, protecting German sea supply routes along the Adriatic, when they were attacked by the Royal Navy Fairmile D motor torpedo boats MTB 659, MTB 662 and MTB 670 near the island of Kukuljari, south of Murter Island. Considering T7 one of the few significant threats to British vessels in the region, the British commander ordered MTB 670 to launch a torpedo attack. The two torpedoes missed, so the MTBs pursued and approached the ship from abaft the beam. The MTBs returned fire with their forward and port guns, and within 30 seconds they had disabled T7'''s weapons and set her ablaze. The MTBs rescued 21 crew. The British crews later examined the wreck, capturing five more sailors and leaving her flooded and burning. A British Army demolition team destroyed the hulk to ensure it could not be salvaged.

Notes

Footnotes

References
 
 
 
 
 
 

 
 
 
 
 
 
 
 
 

Ships built in Fiume
Torpedo boats of the Austro-Hungarian Navy
World War I torpedo boats of Austria-Hungary
Ships of the Royal Yugoslav Navy
Naval ships of Yugoslavia captured by Italy during World War II
Naval ships of Italy captured by Germany during World War II
Navy of the Independent State of Croatia
1916 ships
Torpedo boats of the Royal Yugoslav Navy
Maritime incidents in June 1944
World War II shipwrecks in the Mediterranean Sea
Shipwrecks in the Adriatic Sea